Ready Ready Set Go is the first compilation album (and third album overall) by Canadian musical duo Prozzäk, released under the name Simon and Milo, by Hollywood Records on April 30, 2002. This was a limited edition CD and also enhanced with three bonus videos. The album's name is taken from the opening line from "Pretty Girls (Make Me Nervous)", the first track on the album. All of the tracks were taken from the two previous albums, Hot Show and Saturday People, with the exception of the one new track introduced on the album, "Get a Clue", a theme song for the TV movie of the same name starring Lindsay Lohan. "Get a Clue" is also a featured track in the video game Disney's Extreme Skate Adventure, and its accompanying music video is an unlockable video in the extras section of the game.

Track listing
 "Pretty Girls" - 2:55
 "Omobolasire" - 3:41
 "Sucks To Be You" - 3:21
 "www.nevergetoveryou" - 3:29
 "Get A Clue" - 3:18
 "Be As" - 3:36
 "Infatuation" - 3:40
 "It's Not Me It's You" - 2:46
 "Strange Disease" - 3:26
 "Europa" - 3:30

Enhanced CD videos:
 The Legend of Simon And Milo
 Omobolasire
 Sucks to Be You
Tracks 1, 4 and 6–8 are from Saturday People.
Track 5 is a new track, recorded for the Disney Channel Original Movie Get a Clue.
Tracks 2–3 and 9–10 are from Hot Show.

Prozzäk albums
2002 compilation albums